Jaipur Rural Lok Sabha constituency is one of the 25 Lok Sabha (parliamentary) constituencies in Rajasthan state in western India. This constituency came into existence in 2008 as a part of the implementation of delimitation of parliamentary constituencies.

Assembly segments
Presently, Jaipur Rural Lok Sabha constituency comprises eight Vidhan Sabha (legislative assembly) segments. These are:

Members of Parliament

Election results

2019

2014

2009

See also
 Jaipur district
 List of Constituencies of the Lok Sabha

Notes

External links
Jaipur Rural lok sabha  constituency election 2019 result details

Lok Sabha constituencies in Rajasthan
Jaipur district
Constituencies established in 2008